The Famous Ferguson Case is a 1932 American pre-Code crime film directed by Lloyd Bacon and starring Joan Blondell, Grant Mitchell and Vivienne Osborne. The film's sets were designed by the art director Jack Okey.

Cast 
 Joan Blondell as Maizie Dickson
 Grant Mitchell as Martin Collins
 Vivienne Osborne as Mrs. Marcia Ferguson
 Adrienne Dore as Antoinette 'Toni' Martin
 Tom Brown as Bruce Foster
 Kenneth Thomson as Bob Parks
 Leslie Fenton as Perrin
 Oscar Apfel as Mr. Brooks
 Walter Miller as Cedric Works
 Purnell Pratt as George M. Ferguson
 Willard Robertson as Sheriff
 George Meeker as Jigger Bolton
 Russell Hopton as Rusty Callahan
 George 'Spanky' McFarland as Newsboy
 Leon Ames as Judd Brooks
 J. Carrol Naish as Claude Wright
 William Burress as Dad Sipes
 Clarence Wilson as County Attorney
 Russell Simpson as Banker Craig
 George Chandler as Depot Loafer

References

External links 
 
 

1932 films
1932 crime drama films
American black-and-white films
American crime drama films
1930s English-language films
Films about journalists
Films directed by Lloyd Bacon
Films set in New York (state)
First National Pictures films
Warner Bros. films
1930s American films